Andrea Doria was an ironclad battleship built for the Italian Regia Marina (Royal Navy) in the 1880s and 1890s.

The ship's construction period was very lengthy, beginning in August 1881 and completing in February 1888. She was quickly rendered obsolescent by the new pre-dreadnought battleships being laid down, and as a result, her career was limited. She spent her career alternating between the Active and Reserve Squadrons, where she took part in training exercises each year with the rest of the fleet. Andrea Doria was stricken from the naval register in 1911 and used as a depot ship until Italy entered World War I in 1915. The ship was renamed GR 104 and employed as a guard ship in Brindisi. She was converted into a floating oil tank after the war and was eventually broken up for scrap in 1929.

Design

The ship had a short forecastle, connected by a hurricane deck to a raised sterncastle. Her superstructure included a small conning tower with a bridge on the forecastle. The ship was fitted with a single, heavy military mast placed amidships. She had a crew of 507–509 officers and men.

Her propulsion system consisted of a pair of compound marine steam engines each driving a single screw propeller. Steam was supplied by eight coal-fired, cylindrical fire-tube boilers that were vented through a pair of widely spaced funnels at the ends of the hurricane deck.

Andrea Doria was armed with a main battery of four  27-caliber guns, mounted in two pairs en echelon in a central barbette. She carried a secondary battery of two  32-cal. guns, one at the bow and the other at the stern, and four  32-cal. guns; two of these were placed side by side behind the bow 152 mm gun, and the other two were mounted side by side on the aft superstructure. As was customary for capital ships of the period, she carried five  torpedo tubes submerged in the hull.

The deck sloped downward at the sides to provide additional protection against incoming fire. The barbette had  of steel armor.

Service history

Andrea Doria was under construction for nine-and-a-half years. She was laid down at La Spezia Navy Yard on 7 January 1882 and launched on 21 November 1885. She was not completed for another five-and-a-half years, her construction finally being finished on 16 May 1891. Because of the rapid pace of naval technological development in the late 19th century, her lengthy construction period meant that she was an obsolete design by the time she entered service. In addition, technological progress, particularly in armor production techniques—first Harvey armor and then Krupp armor—rapidly rendered older vessels like Andrea Doria obsolete.

Andrea Doria served with the 2nd Division of the Active Squadron during the 1893 fleet maneuvers, along with the ironclad , which served as the divisional flagship, the torpedo cruiser , and four torpedo boats. During the maneuvers, which lasted from 6 August to 5 September, the ships of the Active Squadron simulated a French attack on the Italian fleet. Beginning on 14 October 1894, the Italian fleet, including Lepanto, assembled in Genoa for a naval review held in honor of King Umberto I at the commissioning of the new ironclad . The festivities lasted three days. Later that year, the squadron stopped in Germany for the celebration held to mark the opening of the Kaiser Wilhelm Canal.

In 1896, Andrea Doria served in the 2nd Division for the summer maneuvers, held in July. The Division also included her sister  and the protected cruiser . The 1st and 2nd Divisions of the Active Squadron were tasked with defending against a hostile fleet, simulated by older ships in reserve. In 1899, Andrea Doria, Ruggiero di Lauria, and Sardegna took part in a naval review in Cagliari for the Italian King Umberto I, which included a French and British squadron as well. That year, Andrea Doria and her two sisters served in the Active Squadron, which was kept in service for eight months of the year, with the remainder spent with reduced crews. The Squadron also included the ironclads Re Umberto, Sicilia, and Lepanto. In 1900, Andrea Doria and her sisters were significantly modified and received a large number of small guns for defense against torpedo boats. These included a pair of  guns, ten  40-caliber guns, twelve  guns, five 37 mm revolver cannon, and two machine guns.

This squadron only entered active service for two months of the year for training maneuvers, and the rest of the year was spent with reduced crews. By 1908, the Italian Navy began to discard its ironclad battleships, including Andrea Dorias two sister ships in 1909. She lingered on in active service only briefly, before she too was stricken on 15 January 1911. She was thereafter used as a depot ship in Taranto. Shortly before Italy entered World War I on the side of the Triple Entente, Andrea Doria was renamed GR 104—a new dreadnought battleship of the same name had just been completed—and was transferred to Brindisi, where she served as a guard ship. Following the end of the war, she was converted into a floating oil tank; she served in this capacity until 1929, when she was broken up for scrap.

Notes

References
 Brassey, Thomas A., ed. (1899). The Naval Annual (Portsmouth: J. Griffin & Co.).
 
 
 
 
 
 Neal, William George, ed. (1896). The Marine Engineer (London: Office for Advertisements and Publication) XVII.

External links

 Andrea Doria (1885) Marina Militare website

Ruggiero di Lauria-class battleships
World War I battleships of Italy
1885 ships
Ships built in La Spezia